Ingebrigt Belle (1 December 1773 – 29 March 1845) was a Norwegian peasant agitator.

References

1773 births
1845 deaths
Norwegian activists